Captain Robert Pearson (May 18, 1879 – July 3, 1956) was a soldier and politician from Alberta, Canada. He served as a Member of the Legislative Assembly of Alberta for two terms between 1917 and 1926.

Early life
Robert Pearson was born May 18, 1879 in Ethel, Ontario to Robert Pearson and Susan Musgrove, he was educated at Listowel High School, and later attended Toronto University attaining a Bachelor of Arts. Pearson would marry Beulah P. Colling on September 16, 1908 and have one daughter. He would serve overseas during the First World War with the Canadian Expeditionary Force 49th Battalion and 31st Battalion.

Political career

Pearson was first elected as a non-partisan to the 4th Alberta Legislature in the 1917 Alberta general election as the top pick in the, At large soldiers' and nurses vote from voters fighting overseas in the First World War. Roberta MacAdams was elected second in the block vote by a very narrow margin behind his total.

He kept his seat in the legislature after the war by running in the 1921 Alberta general election and becoming the fifth person elected in a block vote in the Calgary electoral district to the 5th Alberta Legislature. Robert served his 2nd term in office as an Independent. He did not run again in 1926 and retired from the legislature after two terms.

References

External links
Robert Pearson notice of election Alberta Gazette October 1917

Independent Alberta MLAs
Canadian military personnel of World War I
1879 births
1956 deaths
University of Toronto alumni